Vilensky Uyezd was one of the uyezds of the Russian Empire. The seat was in Vilna.

History
It was established in 1795 under the Vilna Governorate. The Soviet authorities formally abolished it in 1924.

Demographics
At the time of the Russian Empire Census of 1897, Vilensky Uyezd had a population of 363,313. Of these, 25.8% spoke Belarusian, 21.3% Yiddish, 20.9% Lithuanian, 20.1% Polish, 10.4% Russian, 0.8% German, 0.2% Tatar, 0.2% Ukrainian and 0.1% Latvian as their native language.

References

 
Uezds of Vilna Governorate
Vilna Governorate